Turew  is a village in the administrative district of Gmina Kościan, within Kościan County, Greater Poland Voivodeship, in west-central Poland.

The village has a population of 760.

There is an 18th-century manor house in Turew, which until the Second World War belonged to the aristocratic Dryja-Chłapowski family. Among the most notable residents of the house was Dezydery Chłapowski, a Napoleonic officer and a baron of the then French Empire.

References

External links
 Hiking Across Leszno-Region

Villages in Kościan County
Palaces in Poland